Ozyora or Ozera may refer to:
Ozyora, Pskov Oblast, a village in Pskov Oblast, Russia
Ozyora, Tver Oblast, a village in Tver Oblast, Russia
Ozera, Ukraine, a rural settlement in Zhytomyr Oblast, Ukraine